Giovanna Bruno (born 28 June 1975 in Andria) is an Italian politician.

She is a member of the Democratic Party and ran for Mayor of Andria at the 2020 Italian local elections, supported by a centre-left coalition. She was elected at the second round with 58.87% and took office on 13 October 2020.

See also
2020 Italian local elections
List of mayors of Andria

References

1975 births
Living people
Mayors of places in Apulia
People from Andria